Wat Banan is the best-preserved of the Khmer temples in Battambang Province. The distinctive five towers of the temple are similar to the much larger and more famous temple of Angkor Wat. At the base of the mountain, is a step laterite staircase flanked by nagas.

History 

The 11th century temple was built by King Udayadityavarman II son of King Suryavarman I and despite some looting it is in a considerably better state of repair than Wat Ek Phnom. It was built to give thanks, ask for help, and pray to God. In that era, they had a strong belief in god, especially Hindu gods.

However, Udayadityavarman was Shaivite and the sculptures of Phnom Banan are mainly Buddhist. As they were later on defaced like those in Angkor, it's highly likely that the Buddhist temple was the result of a temple rebuilding under Jayavarman VII in the late 12th century.

References 

Buildings and structures in Battambang province
Hindu temples in Cambodia
11th-century Hindu temples